The following television stations operate on virtual channel 47 in the United States:

 K04RY-D in Colorado Springs, Colorado
 K09YZ-D in Beeville-Refugio, Texas
 K13IB-D in Glasgow, Montana
 K13JO-D in Hinsdale, Montana
 K16EJ-D in Peetz, Colorado
 K17EU-D in Holyoke, Colorado
 K17IL-D in Ellensburg, etc., Washington
 K17OA-D in Wray, Colorado
 K18AD-D in East Wenatchee, etc., Washington
 K18FO-D in Idalia, Colorado
 K18MS-D in Akron, Colorado
 K20MH-D in Duncan, Oklahoma
 K20MM-D in New Orleans, Louisiana
 K21NZ-D in Anton, Colorado
 K22JA-D in Corpus Christi, Texas
 K23OM-D in Victorville, California
 K26OT-D in Akron, Colorado
 K29LR-D in Baton Rouge, Louisiana
 K30OC-D in Cottage Grove, Oregon
 K30QB-D in Shreveport, Louisiana
 K30QG-D in Alexandria, Louisiana
 K31KK-D in Kingsville-Alice, Texas
 K33PA-D in Sterling, Colorado
 K33PU-D in Yuma, Colorado
 K34AC-D in Yuma, Colorado
 K35FI-D in Akron, Colorado
 K35MV-D in Concho, Oklahoma
 K35OK-D in Julesburg, Colorado
 K47CY-D in Fort Peck, Montana
 K47JC-D in Wadena, Minnesota
 K47JE-D in Olivia, Minnesota
 K47JK-D in Pocatello, Idaho
 KCNH-LD in Joplin, Missouri
 KEBK-LD in Bakersfield, California
 KFMS-LD in Sacramento, California
 KGPE in Fresno, California
 KGSC-LD in Cheyenne, Wyoming
 KQUP-LD in Spokane, Washington
 KSSJ-LD in San Antonio, Texas
 KTMD in Galveston, Texas
 KTXD-TV in Greenville, Texas
 KUNP-LD in Portland, Oregon
 KWCC-LD in Wenatchee, Washington
 KWHB in Tulsa, Oklahoma
 KWWO-LD in Walla Walla, Washington
 KXLT-TV in Rochester, Minnesota
 KYVE in Yakima, Washington
 W16DS-D in Birmingham, Alabama
 W36EY-D in Berwick, Pennsylvania
 WATV-LD in Orlando, Florida
 WBXI-CD in Indianapolis, Indiana
 WEEV-LD in Evansville, Indiana
 WEWF-LD in Jupiter, Florida
 WIEF-LD in Augusta, Georgia
 WIYE-LD in Parkersburg, West Virginia
 WJAX-TV in Jacksonville, Florida
 WKBS-TV in Altoona, Pennsylvania
 WKTB-CD in Norcross, Georgia
 WMDO-CD in Washington, D.C.
 WMDT in Salisbury, Maryland
 WMSN-TV in Madison, Wisconsin
 WNJU in Linden, New Jersey
 WOIL-CD in Talladega, Alabama
 WPEM-LD in Lumberton, North Carolina
 WRLM in Canton, Ohio
 WRPX-TV in Rocky Mount, North Carolina
 WSYM-TV in Lansing, Michigan
 WTAS-LD in Waukesha, Wisconsin
 WTVP in Peoria, Illinois
 WUTH-CD in Hartford, Connecticut
 WYCH-LD in Rockford, Illinois
 WYKE-CD in Inglis/Yankeetown, Florida
 WZRB in Columbia, South Carolina

The following stations, which are no longer licensed, formerly operated on virtual channel 47:
 KKNF-LD in Lufkin, Texas
 KLPN-LD in Longview, Texas
 W47DX-D in Canovanas, Puerto Rico
 W48DT-D in Guayanilla, Puerto Rico
 WBAX-LD in Albany, New York
 WEKK-LD in Wausau, Wisconsin
 WIED-LD in Greenville, North Carolina
 WSBN-TV in Norton, Virginia

References

47 virtual TV stations in the United States